(3 April 1913 – 20 January 2005) was a Norwegian politician from the Centre Party and the 25th prime minister of Norway from 1965 to 1971. Per Borten is credited for leading the modernization of what was then named Bondepartiet (the Agrarian Party) into today's Centre Party.  He was an active opponent of Norway joining the European Union.

Early life
Borten was born in Flå in the municipality of Melhus in Sør-Trøndelag, and was educated Agriculturist from the Norwegian College of Agriculture in 1939. He started his political career serving as mayor of his home municipally, Flå, from 1945 to 1955. He was elected to the Norwegian parliament in 1949 and stayed there until his retirement in 1977. Borten was President of the Odelsting 1961–1965 and 1973–1977.

Political career
He was appointed president of the Odelsting, acted as the parliamentary leader for his party and served as its chairman from 1955 to 1967. As Prime Minister of Norway from 1965, he headed a four-party centre-right coalition government, until 17 March 1971, when the government dissolved itself. He resigned as Prime Minister when it became known that he had shown confidential information about Norway in the negotiations concerning European Economic Community membership, with amongst others, Arne Haugestad, then leader of the People's Movement against Norwegian membership of the EEC.

Borten's time as Prime Minister of Norway saw the enactment of a range of progressive reforms. Earnings-related pensions were introduced in 1966, while under a June 1969 law the Housing Bank offered loans for improving old dwellings. The Special Supplement to National Insurance Benefits Law of June 1969 established a special supplement for those not entitled to supplementary pensions, and the Law on Compensation Supplement to National Insurance Benefits of December 1969 introduced a supplement to compensate for the introduction of a value-added tax system. The Basic Schooling Law of June 1969 introduced 9-year comprehensive schooling, while under another law passed that same year, family allowances were extended to the first child under the age of 16, while single-parent families were provided with one extra allowance in addition to the number of children.

Later life
After his retirement from politics, Borten continued to speak out on issues such as nuclear disarmament, clandestine surveillance, and the controversy on Norway's relationship to the European Union. He served on the boards of several public banking organizations. He earned a reputation for being an engaging and somewhat contrarian figure in the Norwegian political landscape.

His down-to-earth nature had been strongly underlined in 1969, when newspaper Dagbladet interviewed him at his farm while he was prime minister. He did the interview wearing nothing but a pair of shoes, a hat and trunks, only days before Queen Elizabeth II was invited to the same farm on a state visit to Norway. The picture of Borten in his underwear went around the world, and the British newspaper Daily Mirror printed the picture over two pages with the headline: Now the Norwegian Prime Minister is ready to receive the Queen.

Another popular story was when Borten's Defence Minister, Otto Grieg Tidemand, invited him and others to a private dinner. After eating, Tidemand surprised his guests with the finest vintage brandy. Without blinking Borten responded by pouring the brandy into his coffee, making himself karsk.

Borten died at St. Olav's Hospital in Trondheim at the age of 91. He was buried at Flå Church in the municipality of Melhus. His wife Magnhild died on 2 June 2006, aged 84.

References

External links 
 
 

1913 births
2005 deaths
People from Melhus
Prime Ministers of Norway
Centre Party (Norway) politicians
Norwegian College of Agriculture alumni
Mayors of places in Sør-Trøndelag
Norwegian Lutherans
Members of the Storting
20th-century Norwegian politicians
20th-century Lutherans